Svitavy is a town in the Pardubice Region of the Czech Republic. It has about 16,000 inhabitants. It is the birthplace of Oskar Schindler and the centre of the Czech Esperanto movement. The historic town centre is well preserved and is protected by law as an urban monument zone.

Administrative parts
Svitavy is made up of town parts of Lačnov, Lány, Město and Předměstí.

Etymology
Svitavy was named after the river Svitava. The river's name referred to its clear water and was derived from svítat, which meant "be clear" in Old Czech.

Geography
It lies in the Svitavy Uplands.

The Svitava River springs in the municipal territory and flows through the town. Except for a few small bodies of water, there are two significant fish ponds on the Svitava near the town, Svitavský and Rosnička. They are the remains of the original eleven water works around the town. Rosnička was founded in the first half of the 16th century and Svitavský was established in 1953. In addition to fish farming, they form a suburban recreational area.

History

Svitavy was founded during the colonization by Premonstratensian monks from nearby Litomyšl around 1150. They built the Church of Saint Giles and founded a settlement called Stará Svitava near an old trade route. During the second wave of colonization in around 1250, mostly German-speaking settlers came and founded another settlement called Nová Svitava. Svitavy was first mentioned in 1256 when it was taken over by the bishop of Olomouc, Bruno von Schauenburg, and this year is considered to be the year of foundation of the town.

In 1389, the town walls were built. They protected the town during the Hussite Wars, however the town was conquered. Svitavy often changed owners. In the 16th century, the town flourished economically. The prosperity was interrupted by the Thirty Years' War. In 1645, the town was looted. In 1781, a large fire destroyed most of the town. During the Napoleonic and Austro-Prussian wars, the town suffered as armies passed through the town.

In 1849, the railway was built, which contributed to the development of the town, especially the textile industry. Gradually, over a hundred textile factories were established. Svitavy has retained its industrial character to this day, although the structure has changed significantly.

Svitavy was historically a German-speaking town with a Czech minority. At the beginning of the 20th century the town saw tensions between Czech and German speaking people. In October 1938, the town was added to Sudetenland and occupied by the German army. After the end of the World War II in 1945, the German population was expelled as a result of the Beneš decrees. After 1945, the town was resettled by immigrants from the whole Czechoslovakia.

Demographics

Transport
Svitavy is a transport hub of the area. It is well-connected by rail to other parts of the Czech Republic, including regular connections to Brno and Prague. EuroCity and InterCity trains pass through Svitavy without stopping, but some stop at Česká Třebová, a short distance from Svitavy on the same line. The town also has an intercity bus station with services to various destinations. Two major highways cross just north of Svitavy, E461/43, which goes through the town to Brno and Vienna, and E442/35 going east–west.

Culture

The Czech Esperanto Association is based in the town. It is a follower of several clubs from the first half of the 20th century, re-established in 1969. It co-organizes regional Esperanto meetings, organizes Children's Days, and manages the Esperanto Museum in Svitavy.

Since 2011, Svitavy hosts the annual music festival Rosnička.

The Town Museum and Gallery was founded in 1894 and it is based in its current premises since 1947. It includes permanent exhibition "From the History of Washing Technology" and an exhibition about the life of local native Oskar Schindler.

The multifunctional cultural centre Fabrika was created by reconstruction of a former textile factory from 1926. It is a social centre with a theatre hall and a library.

Sights

Svitavy has a valuable historical core. The Renaissance house from the 16th century were reconstructed in the Baroque style after the fire in 1781.

In the middle of the square is a Baroque Marian column from 1703. The column is surrounded by the three patron saints of the town – St. Sebastian, St. Florian and St. John of Nepomuk. In the grotto of the column there is a statue of St. Rosalie. On the square there is also the Fountain of St. Florian from 1783.

The town walls from 1389 were demolished during the 19th century. A semi-circular bastion is the only remnant.

Civic buildings

Old Town Hall is originally a Renaissance building with a tower, extensively rebuilt after the fire of 1781 and again in 1849. It served as the town hall until 1933 and now it is used for commercial purposes. The adjacent Renaissance "U Mouřenína" House is one of the oldest preserved burgher house in Svitavy, built in 1554. The tourist information centre is now located in the building.

Ottendorfer House is a red-brick historicist building with a tower, it is one of the symbols of the town, built in 1892 by the local native Oswald Ottendorfer on the site of his birthplace. It originally housed the largest public and most modern German-language library in Moravia, later a town cultural centre. Since 2008 the Esperanto Museum and a tea room are located on the ground floor, the ornate hall on the floor above continues to serve as a concert hall.

Langer's Villa houses the present town hall. It is historicist building with rich stucco ornamentation, built in 1892. It was designed by architect Germano Wanderley, who also designed the Ottendorfer House. The house belonged to one of the richest families in Svitavy, local businesspeople. During the Depression, it was rented out to the town treasury, which in turn in 1933 rented the house to the town authorities, who bought the house and transferred the town hall to it.

Budig's Villa was built in German Renaissance style in 1892 for the former mayor and businessman Johann Budig. Nowadays houses the Town Museum and Gallery.

Ecclesiastical buildings

Church of the Visitation of the Virgin Mary is located on the main square. It was probably originally a Romanesque structure built in around 1250. After the fire in 1781, it was rebuilt in the Baroque style. It has an accessible tower with a panoramic view.

Church of Saint Giles was originally a Romanesque basilica built in around 1150. It was rebuilt in the early Baroque style in 1689 and includes preserved original interior equipment. In the vicinity is the valuable Roman Catholic parish house, rebuilt in the Broque style in 1626–1636.

Church of Saint Joseph is a three-nave Neo-Romanesque basilica built in 1894–1896 with valuable decoration. Today the building is owned by a hospital.

Convent of the Sisters of Grace of the St. Vincent de Paul order, founded in 1871, served as a hospital and later became a social care facility. It include the Neo-Gothic Chapel of Saint Vincent de Paul from 1874.

Notable people
Hermann Edler von Zeissl (1817–1884), Austrian dermatologist
Oswald Ottendorfer (1826–1900), German-American journalist, editor and philanthropist
Alexander Makowsky (1833–1908), Austrian botanist, geologist and paleontologist
Maximilian Felzmann (1894–1962), Austrian general
Oskar Schindler (1908–1974), Sudeten German industrialist credited with saving almost 1,200 Jews during the Holocaust
Heidi Lück (born 1943), German politician
Jiří Pernes (born 1948), historian
Jan Moravec (born 1987), footballer

Twin towns – sister cities

Svitavy is twinned with:
 Lądek-Zdrój, Poland
 Perechyn, Ukraine
 Stendal, Germany
 Strzelin, Poland
 Žiar nad Hronom, Slovakia

References

External links

 
Town Museum and Gallery 

Cities and towns in the Czech Republic
Populated places in Svitavy District